James Ole Davidson (February 10, 1854December 16, 1922) was a Norwegian American immigrant and the 21st governor of the U.S. state of Wisconsin.  He also served as lieutenant governor of Wisconsin and state treasurer.

Early life
Davidson was born in Årdal, Sogn og Fjordane County, Norway and immigrated in 1872 to the United States when he was 18 years old. In Boscobel, Wisconsin he worked as a farmhand and as a tailor. Davidson began a successful mercantile business and established his own tailor business in Soldiers Grove, Wisconsin.

Political career
He held several political positions in Wisconsin, and was twice elected village president in Soldiers Grove.
 Davidson was also elected as a Republican candidate to the Wisconsin State Assembly, serving three terms from 1893 to 1899. He was elected Wisconsin state treasurer in 1898 and 1900.

Elected the 19th Lieutenant Governor of Wisconsin alongside governor Robert M. La Follette, Sr., Davidson served until January 1, 1906, when La Follette resigned to join the United States Senate, making Davidson acting governor. He was elected governor in 1906 and reelected in 1908. He served from January 4, 1906, to January 3, 1911; and during his tenure, state regulation of the railroads was extended to include public utilities, telegraph, telephone, electricity, water companies, and the insurance industry. After retiring from office, he was appointed by his gubernatorial successor to a five-year term as president of the State Board of Control.

Death
Davidson died in Madison, Wisconsin, on December 16, 1922 (age 68 years, 309 days), due to pneumonia and heart complications. He is interred at Madison's historic Forest Hill Cemetery.

Family life
Davidson was the son of Ole Davidson and Ingabor (Jenson) Davidson. On February 19, 1883, Davidson married Helen Bliss and they had two daughters, Mabel Elsie and Grace.

See also
List of U.S. state governors born outside the United States

References

External links

National Governors Association

1854 births
Norwegian emigrants to the United States
1922 deaths
Republican Party governors of Wisconsin
Lieutenant Governors of Wisconsin
State treasurers of Wisconsin
Republican Party members of the Wisconsin State Assembly
American Lutherans
People from Årdal
Deaths from pneumonia in Wisconsin
People from Soldiers Grove, Wisconsin
People from Boscobel, Wisconsin
Businesspeople from Wisconsin
Burials in Wisconsin